Belvoir is a commune in the Doubs department in the Bourgogne-Franche-Comté region in eastern France.

Geography

History
Belvoir is noted for the Belvoir Castle,  in French, built by Jean de Chalon. It has been rebuilt, now dating to the 12th-17th centuries, and the date of 1224 inscribed above the arch of the north tower is the oldest inscription in Arabic numerals in the region.

The domain later became the property of the Cusance family, of which Béatrix de Cusance is arguably the most famous member, and the Rohan family were the last noble owners of the castle.

Population

See also
 Belvoir disambiguation page
 Communes of the Doubs department

References

Communes of Doubs